M. dentatus may refer to:
 Melicytus dentatus, the tree violet, a shrub species native to south-east Australia
 Mimulus dentatus , the coastal monkeyflower, a flowering plant species native to the western coast of North America

See also 
 Dentatus (disambiguation)